The Castle Arcade is a shopping arcade in Cardiff, South Wales.

Started in 1887, it runs south from opposite Cardiff Castle, and then turns east to exit on the High Street, north of St Mary Street, in the Castle Quarter. One of the longer of Cardiff's famous Victorian arcades, it is also one of Cardiff's only two level shopping arcades, the other being Cardiff Market.

Castle Arcade has a variety of small shops including cafes, delicatessens, fair-trade and organic retailers. There are also several shops on the gallery level.

Castle Arcade was Grade II* listed in 1975, being the "finest of Cardiff's Victorian arcades". The four storey entrance block facing onto the High Street is separately listed, also as Grade II*.

See also
List of shopping arcades in Cardiff

References

External links
 
Cardiff Castle Arcade Official Website

Shopping arcades in Cardiff
Grade II* listed buildings in Cardiff
Grade II* listed retail buildings
Shopping malls established in 1887
Castle, Cardiff